The 2012 Jackson State Tigers football team represented Jackson State University in the 2012 NCAA Division I FCS football season. The Tigers were led by seventh-year head coach Rick Comegy and played their home games at Mississippi Veterans Memorial Stadium. They were a member of the East Division Southwestern Athletic Conference (SWAC). They finished with an overall record of seven wins and five losses (7–5, 7–2 SWAC)  and lost to Arkansas–Pine Bluff in the SWAC Championship Game.

Schedule

Media
Jackson State games were broadcast on 95.5 Hallelujah FM. All Jackson State games were also streamed online via Yahoo.

References

Jackson State
Jackson State Tigers football seasons
Jackson State Tigers football